Eilema fulminans is a moth of the subfamily Arctiinae. It was described by Hervé de Toulgoët in 1960. It is found in central Madagascar.

This species has a wingspan of 29–31 mm. The head, frons, palpi and thorax are red orange. Forewings are red orange.

References

fulminans
Moths described in 1960